Texan cuisine is the food associated with the Southern U.S. state of Texas, including its native Southwestern cuisine influenced Tex-Mex foods. Texas is a large state, and its cuisine has been influenced by a wide range of cultures, including Southern, German, Czech, British, African American, Creole/Cajun, Mexican, New Mexican, Native American, Asian, and Italian.

The cuisine of neighboring states also influences Texan cuisine, such as New Mexican cuisine and Louisiana Creole cuisine, as such New Mexico chile, Cayenne peppers, and Tabasco sauce are often used in Texan cooking.

Agriculture

In the 1880s, citrus growers in Texas and Florida discovered pink-fleshed seedless grapefruit mutations like the Ruby. Early varieties like the Duncan had many seeds and pale flesh.

Specialties

Barbecue 

Texas barbecue was influenced by the cooking technique barbacoa, a method of slow cooking meat that has been wrapped in leaves in a covered pit.

In the 19th century, cowboys developed techniques to cook the tough beef from range cattle over coals and colonial style open pit barbecue was brought to the state when blacks arrived from the southeast, but later developed into closed pit Western-style barbecue which uses indirect heat instead of coals and imparts a smokier flavor.

Barbecue in Texas is most commonly served with white bread, spicy sauces, pickles, sliced onion, and jalapeños; sides include pinto beans, potato or rice salad, and cabbage slaw. Common desserts served with barbecue are fruit cobbler, banana pudding, and pecan pie.

Steak and beef 
Texas is among a handful of states that developed an early preference for beef barbecue, alongside other states in the neighboring cuisine of the Southwestern United States and the cuisine of the Western United States. Beef brisket (slowly cooked in smoke in a wood-fired "pit") is the most common barbecue.

The influence of steak on Texas barbecue is so great that it is often highlighted in popular culture, for example the animated sitcom King of the Hill. Restaurants that serve Texan cuisine, such as The Big Texan Steak Ranch, and even national brands like Texas Roadhouse, often specialize in steak in particular.

It is illegal to defame the cattle and ranching industries, of either Texas or the Southwestern United States, within the state of Texas.

Pork 
Near the end of the 19th century, immigrants from Germany and Eastern Europe introduced their own distinctive culinary traditions, including sausage making, marked by bold and sometimes piquant spicing and coarser texture, which became part of Texan barbecue culture and smoked sausage remains a popular dish at Western-style barbecues. Early American traditional whole-hog barbecues and later rib barbecues were prepared with pork.

Dessert and pastry

Czech immigrants brought a tradition of pastry-making including fruit-filled kolaches  and sausage-filled klobasniky, pastries. The Texas Legislature has declared West, Texas is the "Home of the Official Kolache of the Texas Legislature," while Caldwell, Texas is "Kolache Capital of Texas." Strudel was brought to Texas by European immigrants.

Sopapillas are a simple fried pastry dough sweetened with sugar and cinnamon. The dish has roots in a lard-fried pastry made by the Tigua Pueblo and Franciscan friars from New Mexico in Ysleta, El Paso. This early form of the pastry dates to at least 1682, as the style originates in New Mexican cuisine, making it one of the earliest pastries known found in Texan cuisine.

Pecan pie is the official state pie of Texas.  The crust for another local specialty, peanut butter pie, is made with crushed vanilla wafers and peanuts. The filling is a sweetened peanut butter pudding made with milk, sugar, peanut butter, corn starch and egg yolks.

Though the origin of the term Texas sheet cake is unknown, with some speculating it's a reference to the cake's large size or decadence, and others who believe it's because the cake includes Texas-style ingredients like buttermilk and pecans, the cake has become a popular dessert throughout the United States since the original recipe was  published by The Dallas Morning News in 1957.

Peach cobbler is the official cobbler.

Hamburger 
An early claim to the invention of the hamburger was Fletcher Davis of Athens, Texas, who claimed to have served it at his restaurant at a time when there were more cows than people in Texas. According to oral histories, in the 1880s, he opened a lunch counter in Athens and served a "burger" of fried ground beef patties with mustard and Bermuda onion between two slices of bread; with a pickle on the side.

The claim is that in 1904, Davis and his wife Ciddy ran a sandwich stand at the St. Louis World's Fair. Historian Frank X. Tolbert noted that Athens resident Clint Murchison said his grandfather dated the hamburger to the 1880s with "Old Dave" a.k.a. Fletcher Davis.

A photo of "Old Dave's Hamburger Stand" from the 1904 connection was sent to Tolbert as evidence of the claim. Also the New York Tribune namelessly attributed the innovation of the hamburger to the stand on the pike.

Southern 

European settlers and African American slaves brought the culinary traditions of the  Deep South with them including biscuits, red-eye gravy, pan-fried chicken, black-eyed peas, mashed potatoes, cornbread or corn pone, sweet tea, and desserts like peach cobbler and pecan pie.

Even after emancipation, many former slaves who had been cooks and domestic servants were not able to afford the highest quality meats and are recognized for the skilled preparation of simple ingredients like greens and beans flavored with salt pork, hog jowl, peppers and spices.

These staple dishes were served alongside game meats, fried chicken and fried catfish. French immigrants from Louisiana introduced influences from Cajun and Louisiana Creole cuisine.

Some claim the corn dog was invented by vendors at the Texas State Fair.

Confederate cush is a dish associated with Confederate troops, the preparation of which was described by one Texas native in 1863 as follows: "chop up a small quantity of fat bacon into a frying pan, get the grease all out of it, put in a quart of water, when it boils crumble in cold corn bread and stir until dry".

Fried okra is a quintessential side dish throughout the American South, including Texas.

Hybrid cuisines

Dating back to the era of  French and Spanish colonial rule in Texas, relations between ethnic groups were tense throughout history, but despite these animosities they have enjoyed food from varied cuisines and incorporated borrowed ingredients into their own, contributing to Texas's varied and rich food culture.

Tex-Mex is the best known hybrid cuisine from Texas but there are many others with contributions from around thirty ethnic groups including Czech, Korean, and Indian. Korean donut shops sell jalapeño kolaches, Indians make fajitas with chutney, and Czech-Tex style hot dogs are topped with both sauerkraut and chili con carne. Other fusion dishes like bulgogi and banh mi burgers can be found as well.

The origin of chicken fried steak is unknown. The town of Lamesa, Texas is claimed as the source of the dish. Governor Rick Perry declared it the "birthplace of the chicken fried steak" in 2011. Lamesa hosts the Chicken Fried Steak Festival each April. Another view is that the dish developed in the cattle country of Texas and the Midwest and still another holding that it's a variation of German schnitzel.

Tex-Mex 

Tex-Mex refers to a style of cooking that combines traditional Northeastern Mexican cuisine that makes heavy use of beef and extremely hot, tiny chiltepin pepper. Combination plates featuring tacos, enchiladas and tostadas served alongside rice and beans are not found in traditional Mexican cuisine.

This custom developed only when Mexican-American cooks adapted offerings for customers who preferred a full plate, rather than the traditional style of eating small, separate dishes.

Commercial manufacture of chili powders began in Texas in the 1890s. Today, chili is the official state dish. Texas is known for its own variation of chili con carne.

Texas chili is typically made with hot peppers and beef (or sometimes game meats like venison) and is sometimes served with pinto beans, either as a side or in the chili itself.

The dish can be topped with an assortment of garnishes including fresh or pickled jalapeños, raw onions or crumbled soda crackers. Thick chili gravy is served over tamales and enchiladas.

Frank X. Tolbert's 1953 recipe included beef-kidney suet, ancho chiles and lean beef for stewing such as chuck seasoned with oregano, garlic, cumin and cayenne pepper.

Breakfast items include scrambled egg in flour tortilla tacos as migas and huevos con chorizo, huevos rancheros, and empanadas of various meats.

King Ranch casserole is made with chicken, cream of mushroom and chicken soups, cheese and tortilla chips.

Entrees are commonly accompanied by pan fried potato and refried beans. 
Ingredients commonly used in Tex-Mex cuisine include goat, chicken, pork, beef, venison, eggs, cheese, milk, beans, masa harina, peppers, chocolate, and various spices.

Puffy tacos made with deep-fried handmade corn tortillas and served with beef picadillo are a San Antonio specialty.

Pan de campo is the official state bread. Also called "cowboy bread", the simple recipe was traditionally baked in a Dutch oven.

Desserts include flan, tres leches cake, sopapillas and pralines.

In the ranch lands of the 1930s, after cattle were butchered, the hide, the head, the entrails, and meat trimmings such as skirt were given to the Mexican cowboys called vaqueros as part of their pay.

Hearty dishes like barbacoa de cabeza (barbecued head), menudo (tripe stew), and fajitas or arracheras (grilled skirt steak) have their roots in this practice. Considering the limited number of skirts per carcass and that the meat wasn't available commercially, the fajita tradition remained regional and relatively obscure for many years, probably only familiar to vaqueros, butchers, and their families. Modern "fajitas" were introduced at a county fair in Kyle, Texas in 1969 by Sonny Falcon, who later opened an Austin restaurant offering fajitas as a main fare.

Other dishes associated with Tex-Mex cooking include guacamole, chile con queso, tostadas with red salsa, tortilla soup, nachos, tacos, quesadillas, chimichangas, burritos,  and carne guisada.

Notable restaurants
The now defunct Kirby's Pig Stand was the first drive in restaurant in the United States. Founder Jessie G. Kirby reportedly pitched it to potential investors in Dallas as a type of roadside dining establishment where people could order and eat without leaving their vehicles. The restaurant served "pig sandwich" made with roast pork, pickle relish and barbecue sauce.

Food and beverage industry
Dr Pepper was founded in Waco, Texas. The Spoetzl Brewery in Shiner, Texas is the oldest independent brewery in Texas, and produces Shiner Beers, including their flagship Shiner Bock. The frozen margarita machine was invented in Dallas by Mariano Martinez.

Frito-Lay is headquartered in Plano, Texas and Frito pie, a dish of Texas chili topped with corn chips and cheese, is a popular recipe to serve at large events.

Blue Bell Creameries is a famous ice-cream manufacturer founded and headquartered in Brenham, Texas.

References

External links 

 Tex-Mex foods at Texas State Historical Association
 Texas barbecue at Food Network
 Cuisine of Texas at Allrecipes.com

 
Cuisine of the Southwestern United States